William, Willie, Will or Bill Crosbie may refer to:

William Crosbie (British Army officer) (1740–1798), British general
William Crosbie (artist) (1915–1999), Scottish artist
William Crosbie, 1st Earl of Glandore (1716–1781), Irish politician
William Francis Crosbie (died 1768),  Irish member of parliament
William Crosbie (engineer), engineer and transportation planner in New Jersey
Sir William Crosbie, 8th Baronet (1855–1936)